Shane Halas is a former Australian rules footballer, who played for the Fitzroy Football Club in the Victorian Football League (VFL).

Career
Halas played 11 games for Fitzroy in the 1985 season, and scored as many goals.

References

External links

Australian rules footballers from Victoria (Australia)
Fitzroy Football Club players
Preston Football Club (VFA) players
1961 births
Living people